Clifford Kuhn (3 October 1925 – 5 September 1978) was a South African cricketer. He played in four first-class matches for Border in 1951/52.

See also
 List of Border representative cricketers

References

External links
 

1925 births
1978 deaths
South African cricketers
Border cricketers
Cricketers from East London, Eastern Cape